Dichroplus elongatus is a species of spur-throated grasshopper in the family Acrididae. It is found in South America.

References

External links

 

Melanoplinae